South African rapper Nasty C has released three studio albums, two extended plays (EPs), 16 singles and 22 music videos (including twenty six as a featured artist). Nasty C's music has been released on record labels Venomous Production, Outy Records, Free World Music, Mabala Noise Entertainment and Universal Music. He gained major attention after the release of his second mixtape Price City, which was released in 2015. He won the Best Freshman Award at the 2015 South African Hip Hop Awards for Price City at the age of 18, making him the youngest recipient for the award.

Nasty C's debut album Bad Hair, was released 23 September 2016 on Audiomack for streaming and free digital download and on iTunes 24 September 2016. It features guest appearances from Omari Hardwick, Riky Rick, Tshego, Tellaman, Erick Rush and Rowlene. Bad Hair was preceded by one single, "Hell Naw", which won Song Of The Year at the 23rd annual South African Music Awards, which took place 27 May 2017. On 2 December 2016, Nasty C released Bad Hair Extensions, an extended version of his debut album Bad Hair. It features 4 new songs and a guest appearance from American hip hop recording artist, French Montana.

On 6 July 2018, Nasty C released his second studio album Strings And Bling, which was issued on major record label Universal Music Group South Africa. The album's release was preceded by four singles "Jungle", "King", "Legendary" and "SMA", which features the singer and first Tall Racks Signee, Rowlene. Strings And Bling features other guest appearances like the American rapper A$AP Ferg and Kaien Cruz. Nasty C surprise-released the single "God Flow" featuring crownedYung, produced by Select Play's Lastee and Tellaman on 27 September 2019. Nasty C's third studio album, Zulu Man with Some Power, was released on 28 August 2020. On September 2022, Nasty C released his fifth mixtape titled "Ivyson Army Tour Mixtape", dedicating the project to all his fans who attended the Ivyson Army Tour, prior to the mixtape's release.

Albums

Studio albums

Mixtapes

EPs

Singles

As lead artist
{| class="wikitable plainrowheaders" style="text-align:center;"
|+ List of singles as lead artist, with selected chart positions and certifications, showing year released and album name
|-
! scope="col" rowspan="2"| Title
! scope="col" rowspan="2"| Year
! scope="col" colspan="1"| Peak chart positions
! scope="col" rowspan="2" style="width:12em;"| Certifications
! scope="col" rowspan="2"| Album
|-
! scope="col" style="width:3em;font-size:100%;"|ZA
|-
! scope="row" | "Juice Back"
| 2015
| 9
|
| Price City
|-
! scope="row" | "Hell Naw"
| rowspan="6"| 2016
| 4 
|
| Bad Hair
|-
! scope="row" | "UNO"
| — 
|
| rowspan="3" 
|-
! scope="row" | "Switched Up"
| — 
|
|-
! scope="row" | "Belong"(with Buffalo Souljah)
| —
|
|-
! scope="row" | "Pressure"
| — 
|
| Bad Hair
|-
! scope="row" | "Uok"
| 13 
|
| Bad Hair Extensions
|-
! scope="row" | "NDA"
| 2017
|
|
| rowspan="3" 
|-
! scope="row" | "Mad Over You (Cover)"
|
|
|
|-
! scope="row" | "031"
|
|
|
|-
! scope="row" | "Allow"(featuring French Montana)
|
|
|
|Bad Hair Extensions
|-
! scope="row" | "Said"(with Runtown)
|
|
|
| rowspan="3" 
|-
! scope="row" | "?Question"(featuring Shekhinah)
|
|
|
|-
! scope="row" | "Changed"
|
|
|
|-
! scope="row" | "King"(featuring A$AP Ferg)
| rowspan="4"| 2018
| — 
| 
| rowspan="3"| Strings and Bling
|-
! scope="row" | "Jungle"
| —
| 
|-
! scope="row" | "Legendary"
| —
| 
|-
! scope="row" | "Wuz Dat"(with Boity)
| —
| 
| 
|-
! scope="row" | "Gravy"
| rowspan="7" |2019
| —
| 
| rowspan="3"|Strings and Bling
|-
! scope= "row" | "SMA"(featuring Rowlene)
| 1
| 
3× Platinum
|-
! scope="row" | "Strings and Bling"
| —
| 
|-
! scope="row" | "There They Go"
| —
| 
| Zulu Man with Some Power
|-
! scope="row" | "Ngyazama (Acapella Zulu freestyle)"
| —
|
| rowspan="3" 
|-
! scope="row" | "God Flow"(featuring crownedYung)
| —
|
|-
! scope="row" | "UNO (C-mix)"
| —
|
|-
! scope="row" | "I Need You"(featuring Rowlene)
| rowspan="4" |2020
| —
|
|Blood & Water Soundtrack
|-
!scope="row" | "They Don't"(with T.I.)
| —
|
| rowspan="3" | Zulu Man with Some Power
|-
!scope="row" | "Eazy"
| —
|
|-
!scope="row" | "Palm Trees"
| —
|
|-
!scope="row" | "Best I Ever Had"
| rowspan="2" |2021
| —
|
| rowspan="5" 
|-
!scope="row" | "Jack"
| —
|-
!scope="row"|"Stalling"
| rowspan="4" |2022
| —
|-
!scope="row"|"Can't Imagine" 
| —
|
|-
!scope="row"|"Og Dee"
| —
|
|-
!scope="row"|"Lemons (Lemonade)" (Nasty C and AKA)
| 2
| RiSA: Platinum
| "Mass Country" 
|
| 
! scope="row"|"Blackout" 
| —

As featured artist

Guest appearances

Music videos

As lead artist

As featured artist

References

External links 
 

Discographies of South African artists
Hip hop discographies